Lang & Heyne is a manufacturer of luxury wristwatches based in Dresden, Germany.

History
Marco Lang began as a precision mechanics apprentice and later, after the German reunification allowed him to, spent a further seven years in horology study. In 2001, he and his friend Mirko Heyne formed Lang & Heyne in Dresden. Whilst their partnership ended in 2003 when Heyne joined Nomos Glashütte, the favourable terms of their split allowed the company name to remain. In 2005 Lang, a fifth-generation watchmaker, was accepted as a member of Académie Horlogère des Créateurs Indépendants.

Models
Current models as of 2015 include Augustus, Köning Johann, and Friedrich August I. The names are all chosen from the Fürstenzug, a large 19th-century mural in Dresden depicting rulers of Saxony, which Lang personally visits on completion of each design.

See also
 List of German watch manufacturers

Further reading

References

German companies established in 2001
Manufacturing companies established in 2001
Manufacturing companies based in Dresden
Watch brands
Watch manufacturing companies of Germany